Antoine Fleming (born 7 October 2000) is an Anguillan footballer who plays as a defender for Kicks United FC and the Anguilla national football team.

Career

International
Fleming made his senior international debut on 10 November 2019 in a 15-0 friendly defeat to Trinidad and Tobago, coming on as a late substitute for Carlique Gumbs.

Career statistics

International

References

External links
Antoine Fleming at Goal.com

2000 births
Living people
Anguillan footballers
Anguilla international footballers
Association football defenders
Kicks United FC players
AFA Senior Male League players